Peter Gojowczyk (born 15 July 1989) is a German professional tennis player. He achieved a career-high ATP singles ranking of world No. 39 in June 2018.

Tennis career

2012: Grand Slam debut
He qualified for his first Grand Slam main draw at the 2012 Australian Open.

2014: Cracking the top 100
Gojowczyk began the year by reaching his first tour-level semifinal at Doha as a qualifier, defeating sixth seed and countryman Philipp Kohlschreiber en route, before losing to Rafael Nadal in three sets (taking the first).

After qualifying at the Australian Open, he broke into the top 100 for the first time in his career.

In April, he defeated Jo-Wilfried Tsonga in five sets in a Davis Cup World Group quarterfinal tie.

In June, Gojowczyk reached the quarterfinals of Halle, defeating world No. 9 Milos Raonic in straight sets in the second round. In August at the US Open, he defeated Benjamin Becker in straight sets in the first round. He ended the year ranked as world No. 79.

2015–2016: Struggles with form, out of top 100

2017: Maiden ATP 250 title
Gojowczyk qualified for and then reached the second round of Wimbledon for the first time in his career at the Wimbledon Championships, defeating Marius Copil in the first round. He then lost to 18th seed Roberto Bautista Agut. Carrying his good form into the following week, Gojowczyk reached the semifinals in Newport.

In September, he won his maiden ATP title at the Moselle Open in Metz as a qualifier, defeating Benoît Paire in straight sets in the final.

2018: Best season: Two ATP finals, top 40 career-high ranking
Gojowczyk was runner-up at the Delray Beach Open. As a result, he reached the top 50 on 5 March 2018. He was also a finalist at the Geneva Open and reached a career-high ranking of world No. 39 on 25 June 2018.

2019–2020: Struggles with form, out of Top 100
Gojowczyk's results during 2019 and 2020 did not match the highs of the 2018 season.

As a lucky loser he reached the semifinals of the 2019 Washington Open losing to third seed Daniil Medvedev.

At the 2020 Australian Open, he qualified and reached the second round for the second time at this Major defeating Christopher Eubanks. He lost to 27th seed Pablo Carreño Busta.

2021: US Open fourth round, return to Top 100
Ranked world No. 141, Gojowczyk qualified for the main draw at the US Open to make his fifth appearance in the main draw. He reached beyond the second round of a Grand Slam for the first time in his career defeating 23rd seed Ugo Humbert and Dušan Lajović both matches in five sets. He went on to reach the fourth round of a Major for the first time in his career defeating fellow qualifier Henri Laaksonen in four sets. He lost in the round of 16 to Carlos Alcaraz in a five-set match 7–5, 1–6, 7–5, 2–6, 0–6. As a result, he climbed 40 spots in the rankings to No. 101 on 13 September 2021.

At the 2021 Moselle Open in Metz, he made the quarterfinals and semifinals again as a qualifier, defeating seventh seed Karen Khachanov and Marcos Giron to reach his third tour-level quarterfinal and second semifinal of the season respectively after Montpellier and Newport. With this run he returned to the Top 100 at World No. 88 on 27 September 2021.

2022–2023: Second ATP 500-level quarterfinal, out of top 300
In 2022, as a lucky loser, Gojowcyk made the quarterfinals in Acapulco, defeating Brandon Nakashima in the first round and advancing after his second round opponent, defending champion Alexander Zverev was defaulted from the tournament due to unsportsmanlike conduct in his doubles match. In the quarterfinals he lost to Cam Norrie in straight sets.

He fell out of the top 300 on 27 February 2023 to No. 333.

Performance timelines

Singles
Current through the 2023 Australian Open qualifying.

ATP Tour finals

Singles: 3 (1 title, 2 runner-ups)

ATP Challenger and ITF Futures finals

Singles: 21 (13–8)

 Doubles: 8 (1–7)

Playing style
Gojowczyk possesses a fast, accurate first serve and great finishing power off both wings. He has a hard-hit, "clubbed" forehand with a long takeback, similar in some ways to Xavier Malisse. His backhand is particularly solid in terms of relative groundstroke quality, opting for frequent injections of pace, whilst not shying away from the down-the-line shot.

Record against top-10 players
Gojowczyk's match record against players who have been ranked world No. 10 or higher, with those who are active in boldface.
Only ATP Tour main draw and Davis Cup matches are considered.
 Statistics correct .''

Top 10 wins
Gojowczyk has a  record against players who were ranked in the top 10 at the time the match was played.

National participation

Davis Cup (1–2)

References

External links

 
 
 

1989 births
Living people
People from Dachau
Sportspeople from Upper Bavaria
German male tennis players
Tennis people from Bavaria